"Fallen" is a song by Danish rock band Volbeat. The song was released on 9 August 2010 as the lead single for their fourth studio album, Beyond Hell/Above Heaven. It was written by singer Michael Poulsen after the death of his father.

Track listing
All songs written and composed by Michael Poulsen. 
CD single

Digital single

iTunes Exclusive EP

Promotional radio CD single

Charts

Weekly charts

Year-end charts

Certifications

References

Volbeat songs
2010 singles
2010 songs
Vertigo Records singles
Songs written by Michael Poulsen
Songs written by Thomas Bredahl